Euro 7 was a Dutch commercial television channel founded by Joop Post with publishing company Keesing and PMT Holding as the main shareholders. Euro 7 was the first commercial station with an official Dutch broadcasting license. The channel was dedicated to programs about nature, the environment, health, leisure, spiritual matters and religion. Ben Wamelink from the public Dutch broadcaster KRO was appointed as Programme Director. Its main focus was on daytime television. Euro 7 was later bought by televangelist Robert H. Schuller through Crystal Cathedral Ministries, known for the weekly Hour of Power television program.

Programming
 Floyd
 Hour of Power
 The Joy of Painting by Bob Ross
 Sport Brunch

References

Television channels and stations established in 1994
Television channels and stations disestablished in 1997
1994 establishments in the Netherlands
1997 disestablishments in the Netherlands
Defunct television channels in the Netherlands